This is a list of elections in Canada in 2016. Included are provincial, municipal and federal elections, by-elections on any level, referendums and party leadership races at any level.

January
January 9: Coast Mountains School District, British Columbia by-election.
January 11: Pincher Creek, Alberta municipal by-election.
January 13: Norfolk Treherne, Manitoba municipal by-election for Ward 1 councillor.
January 16: 
Arrow Lakes School District, British Columbia by-election.
Montrose, British Columbia municipal by-election
January 18: Brooks, Alberta mayoral and municipal by-election.
January 23: Halifax, Nova Scotia municipal by-election for District 6 on Halifax Regional Council. 
January 25: 
Toronto District School Board trustee by-election in Scarborough—Rouge River.
Pickering, Ontario municipal by-election for Ward 1 councillor.
January 31: Granby, Quebec municipal by-election for District 6.

February
February 1: 
Sault Ste. Marie, Ontario municipal by-election for Ward 2 councillor.
Barrie, Ontario municipal by-election for Ward 7 councillor.
Badger, Newfoundland and Labrador municipal by-election.
High Prairie, Alberta municipal by-election.
February 2: Provincial by-elections in the ridings of Vancouver-Mount Pleasant and Coquitlam-Burke Mountain, British Columbia.
February 8: 
Netsilik, Nunavut territorial by-election.
Wood Buffalo, Alberta municipal by-election in Ward 2
February 11: 
Irricana, Alberta municipal by-election.
Provincial by-election in Whitby—Oshawa, Ontario. 
February 14: Longueuil, Quebec municipal by-election for District 8.
February 20: 
Arrow Lakes School District, British Columbia by-election.
Zeballos, British Columbia municipal by-election
February 21: 
Mayoral by-election in Victoriaville, Quebec
Municipal by-election in Sainte-Anne-de-Bellevue, Quebec
Municipal by-election in Saint-Hyacinthe, Quebec in District 7.
February 22: Edmonton Ward 12 municipal by-election to Edmonton City Council.
February 23: St. John's, Newfoundland and Labrador Ward 4 municipal by-election
February 24: Saskatoon Public Schools trustee by-election in Ward 9.
February 27: 
2016 Nova Scotia New Democratic Party leadership election
Langley, British Columbia (city) municipal by-election.
February 28:
Gaspé, Quebec municipal by-election in Ward 4.
Gatineau, Quebec municipal by-election in Lac-Beauchamp District.
Le Rocher-Percé Regional County Municipality prefect by-election.
February 29: County of Vermilion River, Alberta municipal election in Division 4.

March
March 6: 
Lorraine, Quebec mayoral by-election and municipal by-elections for districts 3 and 6.
Saint-Philippe, Quebec District 1 by-election
March 8: Grand Falls-Windsor, Newfoundland and Labrador municipal by-election.
March 10: Rural Municipality of Morris, Manitoba municipal by-election.
March 20: 
Saint-Augustin-de-Desmaures, Quebec District 4 by-election
Sainte-Brigitte-de-Laval, Quebec District 3 by-election
March 21: 
Hamilton, Ontario municipal by-election for Ward 7 on Hamilton, Ontario City Council.
Slave Lake, Alberta municipal by-election.

April
April 4: 2016 Saskatchewan general election
April 9: 
Warfield, British Columbia municipal by-election
Pouce Coupe, British Columbia mayoral by-election
April 10: Côte-Saint-Luc, Quebec municipal by-election
April 11: 
Oakville, Ontario municipal by-election in Ward 2.
Chicoutimi provincial by-election.
April 17: 
Carignan, Quebec District 4 by-election.
Victoriaville, Quebec District 9 by-election.
Chandler, Quebec East Sector by-election.
April 19: 2016 Manitoba general election
April 24: 
Montreal North borough mayoral by-election.
Saint-Hippolyte, Quebec District 4 by-election
April 25: Seguin, Ontario Ward 4 municipal by-election.

May
May 1: Sainte-Adèle, Quebec Mayoral and municipal by-elections
May 2:
Thorsby, Alberta municipal by-election.
County of Grande Prairie No. 1, Alberta municipal by-election in Division 8.
May 9: 
2016 New Brunswick municipal elections
Nunavut municipal land referendums
May 14: Stikine School District by-election.
May 15: 
Baie-Comeau, Quebec District 5 by-election.
Val-d'Or, Quebec District 2 by-election.
May 18: Brandon, Manitoba municipal by-election in Riverview Ward
May 22: 
Brownsburg-Chatham, Quebec mayoral and municipal by-elections.
Calgary-Greenway, Alberta provincial by-election. 
May 28: 
Pictou County, Nova Scotia amalgamation plebiscite. and District 3 by-election.
Grand Forks, British Columbia council by-election.

June to August
June 11:
Winnipeg, Manitoba school trustee by-elections.
New Westminster School District by-election.
June 12: Municipal by-election in District 3, Rigaud, Quebec.
June 16: Municipal by-election in North Ward, Whitby, Ontario.
June 18: Greenwood, British Columbia council by-election.
June 19:
Mayoral by-election and municipal by-election in North Ward, Delson, Quebec.
Municipal by-election in District 5, Mount Royal, Quebec.
Municipal by-election in District 1, Mont-Joli, Quebec.
Mayoral by-election in Donnacona, Quebec.
Municipal by-election in District 3, Boucherville, Quebec.
Mayoral by-election in Beaupré, Quebec.
June 20: Toronto District School Board by-election in Toronto Centre—Rosedale.
June 21: Sundre, Alberta municipal by-election.
June 25: Cache Creek, British Columbia council by-election.
July 18: Hinton, Alberta municipal by-election 
July 20: Conseil scolaire francophone de la Colombie-Britannique by-election.
July 25: 
Toronto City Council by-election in Ward 2.
Toronto District School Board by-elections in York Centre and Etobicoke North.
July 30: Municipal elections in Saskatchewan's resort villages.
August 18: Temagami, Ontario municipal by-election.
August 21: Saint-Félicien, Quebec municipal by-election in District 3.
August 22: Black Diamond, Alberta mayoral and municipal by-elections.
August 29: West Lincoln, Ontario municipal by-election in Ward 3.
August 30: Provincial by-election in Halifax Needham, Nova Scotia.

September to October
September 1: Provincial by-election in Scarborough—Rouge River, Ontario. 
September 2: Brock, Ontario municipal by-election in Ward 2.
September 10: Lytton, British Columbia municipal by-election.
September 17: Ashcroft, British Columbia municipal by-election.
September 18: Oka, Quebec municipal by-election in District 2.
September 19: Greater St. Albert Catholic Schools trustee by-election.
September 25: Saint-Lazare, Quebec municipal by-election in District 4.
October 1: Regional District of Fraser-Fort George, British Columbia municipal by-election. 
October 2: Yukon Francophone School Board trustee election.
October 7: 2016 Parti Québécois leadership election
October 8: Central Coast Regional District, British Columbia municipal by-election.
October 14: Tecumseh, Ontario municipal by-election in Ward 2
October 15: 2016 Nova Scotia municipal elections
October 17: 
Newmarket, Ontario municipal by-election in Ward 5
Provincial by-election in Summerside-Wilmot, Prince Edward Island 
High River, Alberta municipal by-election.
October 22 
2016 Progressive Conservative Party of New Brunswick leadership election
Parksville, British Columbia municipal by-election.
Zeballos, British Columbia municipal by-election.
Port Hardy, British Columbia municipal by-election.
October 23: 
Wentworth, Quebec municipal by-election in Seat #3.
McMasterville, Quebec municipal by-election in District 6.
October 24: Federal by-election in Medicine Hat—Cardston—Warner, Alberta.
October 26: 2016 Saskatchewan municipal elections
October 29: Castlegar, British Columbia municipal by-election.
October 30: Windsor, Quebec District 1 municipal by-election.

November to December
November 5: 
School District 53 Okanagan Similkameen, British Columbia by-election.
Winnipeg School Division Ward 7 trustee by-election.
November 6: 
Cantley, Quebec de la Rive district municipal by-election.
Prévost, Quebec District 3 municipal by-election.
October 26-November 7: 2016 Prince Edward Island electoral reform referendum
November 7: 2016 Yukon general election
November 12: Fraser Lake, British Columbia municipal by-election.
November 14: 
Municipal by-elections in New Brunswick: Baker Brook, Clair, Drummond, Maisonnette, Meductic (councillor, at-large); Miramichi (mayor and councillor at-large); Moncton (Ward 4 councillor); Saint-André (Ward 5 councillor)
Haut-Madawaska, New Brunswick rural community amalgamation plebiscite.
November 17: Provincial by-elections in Ottawa—Vanier and Niagara West—Glanbrook, Ontario. 
November 19: 
West Vancouver, British Columbia municipal by-election
Houston, British Columbia municipal by-election
Armstrong, British Columbia municipal by-election
Lions Bay, British Columbia municipal by-election and loan authorization bylaw referendum
November 20: 
Nicolet, Quebec mayoral and district 5 municipal by-election.
Outremont, Quebec places of worship ban on Bernard Avenue referendum.
December 3: Midway, British Columbia municipal by-election
December 5: Provincial by-elections in Marie-Victorin, Saint-Jérôme, Arthabaska and Verdun
December 10: 
Burns Lake, British Columbia municipal by-election
Fort St. James, British Columbia municipal by-election
December 11: Sainte-Anne-des-Monts, Quebec mayoral by-election 
December 18: Saint-Félix-de-Valois, Quebec District 2 municipal by-election

References

 
Political timelines of the 2010s by year